Light Hall is a historic building on the campus of Western New Mexico University in Silver City, New Mexico. It was built as a library and auditorium in 1928, and it was later remodelled into classrooms. It was named in honor of Dr. C. M. Light, WNMU's president from 1896 to 1915, who attended the dedication on April 20, 1928. Governor Richard C. Dillon was also in attendance. The building was designed in the Renaissance Revival style by Trost & Trost. It has been listed on the National Register of Historic Places since September 22, 1988.

References

National Register of Historic Places in Grant County, New Mexico
Renaissance Revival architecture in New Mexico
School buildings completed in 1928
School buildings on the National Register of Historic Places in New Mexico
Western New Mexico University
1928 establishments in New Mexico